KMCB may refer to:

 KMCB (TV), a television station (channel 22) licensed to serve Coos Bay, Oregon, United States
 McComb-Pike County Airport (ICAO code KMCB)